Wucherer's worm lizard (Leposternon wuchereri) is a worm lizard species in the family Amphisbaenidae. It is endemic to Brazil.

References

Leposternon
Reptiles of Brazil
Endemic fauna of Brazil
Reptiles described in 1879
Taxa named by Wilhelm Peters